This is a list of airlines currently operating in South Korea.

Scheduled airlines

Cargo airlines

See also
 List of defunct airlines of South Korea
 List of airports in South Korea
 List of busiest airports in South Korea by passenger traffic
 List of airlines

References

Airlines
South Korea
Airlines
South Korea